Stephan R. Epstein (15 March 1960 – 3 February 2007), known as "Larry", was a British economic historian, and a professor at the London School of Economics.

Brought up in Switzerland, he studied at the University of Siena, and later received a PhD from the University of Cambridge. In 1992 he was made a lecturer in economic history at the LSE, by 1997 he had been appointed reader, and in 2001 professor.

Epstein's PhD thesis was on economic development and social transformation in late medieval Sicily. Later he expanded his research to a greater European scale, with his 2000 book Freedom and Growth, where he explored the interaction between state formation and economic development. For this work he won the Ranki Prize for a book on European economic history in 2001. Epstein also worked on the history of technology, and on the influence of guilds on technological development in medieval Europe.

Publications
 Freedom and Growth: The Rise of States and Markets in Europe, 1300–1750, Routledge, 2000, 
 An Island for Itself: Economic Development and Social Change in Late Medieval Sicily, Cambridge University Press, 1992, 
 Alle origini della fattoria toscana: L'ospedale di Siena e le sue terre (metà '200–metà '400), Firenze: Salimbeni, 1986

External links
Obituary on Times online.

1960 births
2007 deaths
Economic historians
Historians of Sicily
British medievalists
Academics of the London School of Economics
University of Siena alumni